Jahara binti Hamid (born 18 May 1951) is a Malaysian politician and served as Member of the Penang State Legislative Assembly for Telok Ayer Tawar from 1995 to 2018 and former Leader of the Opposition Penang State Legislative Assembly.

Election results
Penang State Legislative Assembly

Honours
  :
  Officer of the Order of the Defender of State (DSPN) - Dato'''' (2002)

References

Living people
1951 births
Malaysian people of Malay descent
Malaysian Muslims
United Malays National Organisation politicians
Members of the Penang State Legislative Assembly
Women MLAs in Penang